Maple Meadows station is a stop on the West Coast Express commuter rail line connecting Vancouver to Mission, British Columbia, Canada. The station is located on the north side of the Canadian Pacific Railway (CPR) tracks in Maple Ridge, just off Maple Meadows Way and Hammond Road. The station opened in 1995, when the West Coast Express began operating. 467 park and ride spaces are available. All services are operated by TransLink.

Station information

Station layout

Transit connections

Maple Meadows is served by five West Coast Express trains per day in each direction: five in the morning to Vancouver, and five in the evening to Mission. The station is adjacent to a bus loop and park-and-ride facility, which are served by the local and express bus and Community Shuttle minibus services.

Notes

References

External links
Maple Meadows station map (PDF file)

Maple Ridge, British Columbia
Railway stations in Canada opened in 1995
West Coast Express stations